The following is the final results of the Iranian Volleyball Super League 1997/98 season.

Standings

References 
 volleyball.ir
 Parssport

League 1997-98
Iran Super League, 1997-98
Iran Super League, 1997-98
Volleyball League, 1997-98
Volleyball League, 1997-98